Tom Lambert (born 20 November 2000) is an Australian rugby union player for Glasgow Warriors in the Pro14. Lambert's primary position is loosehead prop.

Rugby Union career

Born in Sydney and schooled at Trinity Grammar School, Lambert represented Australian Schools and was part of the Waratahs Academy before heading overseas to Scotland in 2020. 

Lambert represented Scotland’s under-20s side during the 2020 Six Nations, and signed with Glasgow Warriors on an academy contract before graduating to the main team in 2021.

Lambert was named as a member of the Glasgow Warriors academy for the 2020–21 season. He made his debut for Glasgow Warriors in Round 1 of the Pro14 Rainbow Cup against .

It was announced on 17th August 2022 that Lambert would return to his city of birth for the 2023 season, having signed with the NSW Waratahs.

External links
itsrugby.co.uk Profile
Glasgow Warriors Profile

References

2000 births
Living people
Glasgow Warriors players
Rugby union players from Sydney
Rugby union props
Scottish rugby union players
Australian rugby union players
New South Wales Waratahs players